2017 Dhaka Senior Division Football League is also known as Saif Powertec Senior Division Football League due to sponsorship reason. It will be the leagues 58th season and 5th season as Bangladesh's third-tier. In this season there are  12 teams participating in the tournament.

2017 Dhaka Senior Division League Teams 
The following 12 clubs competed in the Dhaka Senior Division League during the 2017 season.
 Bangladesh Boys Club
 Basabo Tarun Sangho
 Dhaka Wanderers Club
 Dhaka United SC
 Badda Jagoroni Sangsad
 PWD Sports Club
 Shadharan Bima Kira Sangstha
 Friends SWO
 Jatrabari KC
 Mohakhali XI
 Swadhinata KS
 Wari Club

References 

Dhaka League